Broxtowe refers to a number of geographic entities, current and historic, in Nottinghamshire, England:

 Broxtowe, Nottingham, a housing estate in Apsley ward, within the City of Nottingham
 Broxtowe (UK Parliament constituency), the constituency with similar boundaries to the borough
 Borough of Broxtowe, a local government area in south west Nottinghamshire
 Broxtowe Wapentake, a previous division of the county, including, but larger than, the current borough